Sir William George Turner (1872 – 14 June 1937) was an American-born unionist politician in Northern Ireland, who served as Lord Mayor of Belfast for over five years.

Life
Born in United States, Turner became a fruiterer on the Shankill Road.  

He first stood for election to Belfast Corporation in the Cliftonville ward in 1909.  Although he was officially an independent Unionist, he had the backing of the local Conservative Party.  However, he was defeated by the footballer William Kennedy Gibson. Turner was later successful as an Ulster Unionist Party candidate for the city council.  He served as Lord Mayor of Belfast from 1923 to 1928; his mayoralty also made him an ex-officio member of the Senate of Northern Ireland.

He was knighted in 1924, while in 1927 he was appointed to the Privy Council of Northern Ireland.

Arms

References

1872 births
1937 deaths
Lord Mayors of Belfast
High Sheriffs of Belfast
Members of the Senate of Northern Ireland 1921–1925
Members of the Senate of Northern Ireland 1925–1929
People from County Tyrone
Ulster Unionist Party members of the Senate of Northern Ireland
Knights Bachelor